Piya Basanti is a Hindi album released on 28 November 2000. Sultan Khan and K. S. Chithra are the singers and Kishan Rajbhatt and Sandesh Shandilya  are the composers. The album went on to become a huge success, winning an International Viewer Choice award from MTV.
Recorded at Stage Sound Studios.
Mix and Mastered by Kishan Rajbhatt

Soundtrack

The accompanying music video for "Piya Basanti" and "Surmayi Aankhen" featured newcomer acts Nauheed Cyrusi and Donovan Wodehouse.

Awards
Won International Viewer's Choice Award at the 2001 MTV Video Music Awards in the Hindi pop genre.

References

2000 albums
Albums by Indian artists
Hindi-language albums
Sony International albums